Gornja Britvica is a village in Bosnia and Herzegovina. According to the 1991 census, the village is located in the municipality of Široki Brijeg.

Demographics 
According to the 2013 census, its population was 58, all Croats.

References

Populated places in Široki Brijeg